Bad Machinery is a webcomic written and drawn by John Allison and set in the fictional West Yorkshire town of Tackleford, England. Bad Machinery started on 21 September 2009 loosely based on characters and situations from John Allison's previous webcomic, Scary Go Round. New full colour paneled pages appeared four times a week.

The story of Bad Machinery picks up three years after the end of Scary Go Round and involves two groups of schoolchildren that investigate mysteries.

History
After the announcement of the end of Scary Go Round, John Allison answered readers' questions about the "new comic" in his blog, posted on 2009-09-13. He gave several hints as to the content of the new comic, indicating a preference to move away from writing about the lives of twenty-somethings, and the dispensing of many characters from Scary Go Round. In another post, the title of the new comic was revealed to be Bad Machinery, and each story (with the exception of the preamble) would be 100 pages long. The comic is named after a song by indie band Let's Active.

On 21 September 2009, after a one-week hiatus following the end of Scary Go Round, Bad Machinery was launched on the same web site that had previously hosted Scary Go Round, titled Scary Go Round Presents Bad Machinery.

On 21 May 2012 Oni Press announced that it would be publishing collections of the Bad Machinery storylines, and the first full-colour paperback, The Case of the Team Spirit, was released in March 2013.

Content
In Bad Machinery, two groups of child investigators attend the fictional Griswalds Grammar School in Keane End, Tackleford. The groups interact and compete to solve the mysteries, keeping a tally on a wall. They are not always aware that they are both working on the same mystery or dilemma, as they start with different leads.

Bad Machinery focuses on humour, with funny and surreal situations, punctuated by moments of action and mystery. Every episode is comedic, and the artist will frequently add visual jokes in the background. Bad Machinery is also proudly British in its sensibilities.

Publications

Reception
Describing Bad Machinery as her favorite webcomic of 2011, Lauren Davis of Comics Alliance praised Bad Machinery for its absurd scenarios, and both she and Hannah Shannon of Bleeding Cool praised the webcomic's humorous dialogues. Shannon stated that the "eye candy art" of Bad Machinery is her favorite part of the webcomic, pointing out that the large page lay-out of the books presents all the details well.

Staff of The A.V. Club noted that Bad Machinery had difficulty finding its footing when it first started. Allison's attempt to differentiate Bad Machinery from Scary Go Round despite the overlap in cast resulted in a "bone dry" execution. As Allison got a feel for his new, younger cast, "the stories became looser and richer." The A.V. Club praised Allison's work as consistently reaching the "sweet spot of character-driven comedy," where humour arises naturally through the characters' dialogue.

In February 2016, Young Adult Library Services Association listed Volume 4 of Bad Machinery in its annual "Great Graphic Novels For Teens" list. Lore Sjöberg of Wired listed the webcomic among their best new webcomics of 2010 and Publishers Weekly listed Bad Machinerys first volume, The Case of the Team Spirit, among its best children's books of 2013.

References

External links
 , now hosting other John Alison comics.
 Scarygoround.com

2000s webcomics
2009 webcomic debuts
British comedy webcomics
Fantasy webcomics
Webcomics in print
2010s webcomics
Comics set in England
Comics spin-offs
Humor comics
Mystery comics
School-themed comics